"Submarines" is a song by American folk rock band The Lumineers. It impacted modern rock radio in the United States as the third single from their debut studio album The Lumineers (2012).

Charts

References

2012 songs
The Lumineers songs
2013 singles
Dualtone Records singles